The Chronicles of Ramlar is a fantasy role-playing game released by Whitesilver Publishing Inc. and created by John Anthony Prescott.

History
The small press company White Silver Publishing reprinted the Sovereign Stone role-playing game core rules, after which they started working on The Chronicles of Ramlar which was published in 2006.

Setting 
The Ramlar referred to in the title is not the name of the world, but its creator, an omnipotent deity who rules over the many other gods and goddesses who rule various aspects of the world. The world itself is divided into two continents, default gameplay beginning on the continent of Eranon.

System 
Ramlar uses a combat system called "The A/B System" (short for Armor/Body). Character sheets prominently display a body diagram. The body diagram is essentially a hit location chart with each body part having its own life points and armor to protect that part.  Ramlar also makes use of a combat mechanic called momentum, which allows players to turn previous success into an opportunity for potentially larger successes.  The game uses percentile dice.

References

External links
http://www.flamesrising.com/chronicles-of-ramlar-rpg-review/
http://www.rpg.net/reviews/archive/12/12449.phtml
http://www.scifi.com/sfw/sound/sfw17543.html
http://flamesrising.rpgnow.com/product_info.php?products_id=50415

Fantasy role-playing games
Role-playing games introduced in 2006